Tre Mitchell (born September 24, 2000) is an American college basketball player for the West Virginia Mountaineers of the Big 12 Conference. He previously played for the UMass Minutemen and the Texas Longhorns.

High school career
In his first two years of high school, Mitchell played for Elizabeth Forward High School in Elizabeth, Pennsylvania, before transferring to Woodstock Academy in Woodstock, Connecticut. As a senior, he averaged 16.6 points, 13.5 rebounds, 3.6 assists and 2.6 blocks per game, leading his team to a 39–2 record and the National Prep Championship quarterfinals. Mitchell was named Connecticut Gatorade Player of the Year. He was selected as Power 5 Conference AAA Player of the Year and Hoophall Classic Most Valuable Player honors in both of his years at Woodstock. Mitchell competed for Expressions Elite on the Amateur Athletic Union circuit. He was a consensus four-star recruit and committed to play college basketball for UMass over offers from Georgia Tech, Indiana, Providence, Syracuse and Virginia Tech, among others.

College career
Mitchell scored 30 points on February 4, 2020, in a 73–67 loss to Rhode Island. On February 22, Mitchell recorded 15 points and a freshman season-high 19 rebounds in a 57–49 win over Fordham. In his final game of the season, on March 7, he posted a season-high 34 points and 12 rebounds in a 64–63 loss to Rhode Island. As a freshman, Mitchell led his team with 17.7 points and 7.2 rebounds per game. He set a school freshman record for field goals and finished eight points shy of Jim McCoy's school freshman scoring record. Mitchell was a six-time Atlantic 10 Rookie of the Week and won the award for the final five weeks of the regular season, the longest streak since Lamar Odom in the 1998–99 season. He also earned Atlantic 10 Rookie of the Year and Second Team All-Atlantic 10 honors, becoming the first UMass freshman to receive all-conference honors since Marcus Camby in 1994. As a sophomore, Mitchell averaged 18.8 points and 7.2 rebounds per game. He was named to the First Team All-Atlantic 10. Mitchell transferred to Texas after the season. As a junior, he averaged 8.7 points and 4.0 rebounds per game. On February 15, 2022, the program announced that Mitchell would take an indefinite leave of absence from the team; he missed the rest of the season. Following the season, Mitchell again entered the transfer portal, and later committed to West Virginia.

Career statistics

College

|-
| style="text-align:left;"| 2019–20
| style="text-align:left;"| UMass
| 31 || 31 || 30.8 || .481 || .330 || .728 || 7.2 || 1.9 || 1.0 || 1.0 || 17.7
|-
| style="text-align:left;"| 2020–21
| style="text-align:left;"| UMass
| 13 || 12 || 32.2 || .519 || .375 || .768 || 7.2 || 2.2 || 1.2 || 1.5 || 18.8
|-
| style="text-align:left;"| 2021–22
| style="text-align:left;"| Texas
| 24 || 17 || 18.6 || .478 || .326 || .800 || 4.0 || 1.3 || .7 || .7 || 8.7
|- class="sortbottom"
| style="text-align:center;" colspan="2"| Career
| 68 || 60 || 26.8 || .489 || .338 || .754 || 6.0 || 1.8 || .9 || 1.0 || 14.7

References

External links
Texas Longhorns bio
UMass Minutemen bio

2000 births
Living people
American men's basketball players
Basketball players from Pittsburgh
Centers (basketball)
Texas Longhorns men's basketball players
UMass Minutemen basketball players